Gennadi Krasnitsky club is a list of Uzbek football players that have scored 100 or more goals during their professional career. This club is named after first Uzbekistani player in Soviet Union who scored over 100 goals - Gennadi Krasnitsky. 

The club was founded by Uzbekistan Football Association in August 2010 in memory of legendary striker of Pakhtakor and with intention to stimulate youth for achievements in football. 

The first player who scored its first 100 goals in Uzbekistan Super League was Oleg Shatskikh. He needed for that six seasons. The first player who scored its 200 goals in League was Zafar Kholmurodov.

Anvar Berdiev is leading the goalscorer's list with 277 goals (as of 2 December 2019). In 2016 season Anvar Berdiev playing for Andijan scored another 4 goals in League matches, he scored in Uzbekistan Super League totally 225 goals. Artur Gevorkyan is first foreign footballer who entered this goalscorer's club. Gevorkyan scored his over 100 goals in April 2015.

Goals
The following goals are counted:
 Championship - goals scored in Uzbek League, top division of Uzbek football
 Cup - goals scored in Uzbek Cup
 Asian Cup - goals scored in AFC Champions League and AFC Cup, the international club tournaments of AFC
 National team - goals scored for national team

Gennadi Krasnitsky club 

 Players whose name is listed in bold are active players

See also
 Grigory Fedotov club
 Club 200 of Berador Abduraimov
 Uzbekistan Super League Top Scorer
 Uzbekistan Footballer of the Year
 Uzbekistan Super League

References

External links
Бомбардиры: Кто разменяет сотню?, December 2008
Сервер Джепаров: есть 100 голов!

Lists of footballers in Uzbekistan
Association football player non-biographical articles